Licorice Pizza was a Los Angeles record store chain that inspired the title of Paul Thomas Anderson's 2021 film of the same name. The term is a colloquial expression for vinyl records, comparing them to the color of licorice and the shape of a pizza.

James Greenwood opened the first Licorice Pizza record store in July 1969 in Downtown Long Beach. In the next fifteen years, multiple locations spread throughout Southern California. They became known for highly knowledgeable staff, all request sound systems, getting new releases first, and giving away free licorice. 
He recalls that the Licorice Pizza name was selected because he heard it to describe a record on the Bud & Travis... In Concert album and it sounded better than "Jim's Records."

Matt Groening, creator of The Simpsons, worked at one on Sunset Boulevard in the early 1980s, where he first printed and sold his comic strip Life in Hell.

One of the stores can be seen in the Ridgemont Mall in the 1982 film Fast Times at Ridgemont High.

Licorice Pizza was acquired by Sam Goody in 1986.

References

Music retailers of the United States
Retail companies established in 1969
Retail companies disestablished in 1986
1969 establishments in California
1986 disestablishments in California
American companies established in 1969
American companies disestablished in 1986
Retail companies based in California
Defunct companies based in Greater Los Angeles
Companies based in Long Beach, California
1986 mergers and acquisitions